Baron Silsoe, of Silsoe in the County of Bedford, is a title in the Peerage of the United Kingdom. It was created on 18 January 1963 for the barrister Sir Malcolm Trustram Eve, 1st Baronet. He had already been created a Baronet, of Silsoe in the County of Bedford, on 18 January 1943. He was succeeded by his son, the second Baron. Known as David Silsoe, he was also a barrister.  the titles are held by his son Simon, the third Baron, who succeeded in 2005.

Silsoe is a town in Bedfordshire.

The family seat is Neals Farm, near Reading, Berkshire.

Barons Silsoe (1963—)

  Arthur Malcolm Trustram Eve, 1st Baron Silsoe (1894–1976)
  David Malcolm Trustram Eve, 2nd Baron Silsoe (1930–2005)
  Simon Rupert Trustram Eve, 3rd Baron Silsoe (1966—)
 (1) Hon. Peter Nanton Trustram Eve (1930—)
 (2) Richard Malcolm Jannion Trustram Eve (1963—)
 (3) Alexander Christopher Peter Trustram Eve (1993—)
 (4) James Arthur Richard Trustram Eve (1996—)
 (5) Nicholas Dominic Peter Trustram Eve (1965—)

The heir presumptive is the present holder's uncle, the Hon. Peter Nanton Trustram Eve (born 1930).

The heir presumptive's heir apparent is the present holder's nephew, Richard Malcolm Jannion Trustram Eve (born 1963).

Notes

References
Kidd, Charles, Williamson, David (editors). Debrett's Peerage and Baronetage (1990 edition). New York: St Martin's Press, 1990, 

Baronies in the Peerage of the United Kingdom
Noble titles created in 1963